Roy Williams (3 March 1929 – 29 May 1988) was an Australian rules footballer who played with Collingwood in the Victorian Football League (VFL).

Notes

External links 

Collingwood Forever

1988 deaths
1929 births
Australian rules footballers from New South Wales
Collingwood Football Club players
Queanbeyan Football Club players